Abdullah al-Saadawi (born 1948) is a Bahraini actor, director, and playwright.

He won the Directing Award at the Cairo International Festival for Contemporary and Experimental Theatre for his production of the play الكمامة (“The Gag”). He is a founding member of several regional theatre companies, including Al-Sawari Theatre in Bahrain, the Al-Sadd Theatre in Qatar, and the Sharjah National Theatre in Sharjah, United Arab Emirates.

Al-Saadawi's debut in theatre came in the mid-1960s, when his play, الحمار ومصقلة الإعدام (“The Donkey and the Pallet Execution”), was directed by Jamal al-Saqr with some edits by the latter as مؤلف ضاع في نفسه (“A Writer Lost in Himself”). Soon afterwards, he helped the People's Union Theatre produce its first play in his native Muharraq, a production of (“Antigone”).

Career

References

Arab film directors
Bahraini male actors
1948 births
Living people